In the sociolinguistics of the English language,  raising or short-a raising is a phenomenon by which the "short a" vowel , the  vowel (found in such words as ash, bath, man, lamp, pal, rag, sack, trap, etc.), is pronounced with a raising of the tongue. In most American and many Canadian English accents,  raising is specifically  tensing: a combination of greater raising, fronting, lengthening, and gliding that occurs only in certain words or environments. The most common context for tensing  throughout North American English, regardless of dialect, is when this vowel appears before a nasal consonant (thus, for example, commonly in fan, but rarely in fat).

Distinction between phonemic and non-phonemic /æ/ raising 
Short-a (or ) tensing has two possible forms: either non-phonemic ("continuous") or phonemic ("split"). In General American, for example, the word man can be pronounced on a continuum from the lax-vowel  to the tense-vowel , but the latter pronunciation is much more common. However, both vowel qualities are considered possible variations (allophones) of the single "short a" phoneme in man. Therefore, General American uses a continuous system in which a tensed allophone does not demonstrate that a new phoneme has splintered off from the original.

In some American English dialects, however, including the New York City and Philadelphia ones, the "short a" sound can actually split into two entirely distinct phonemes and so using a tense vowel rather than a lax vowel could change the meanings of words or phrases. Therefore, such dialects have a phonemic split of the "short a" vowel, sometimes called a "short-a split system". The relationship between two words (like Manning and manning) that differ in only a single differentiating sound is known as a minimal pair. Here are further examples of minimal pairs of the short a that use the Philadelphia and General American accents for reference as, respectively, phonemic and non-phonemic accents:

Phonemic  raising systems 
In a North American short-a phonemic split system (or, simply, a short-a split), the terms "raising" and "tensing" can be used interchangeably. Phonemic tensing occurs in the dialects of New York City and the Mid-Atlantic States (centering on the cities of Philadelphia and Baltimore). It is similar in its word patterns but not in its resulting pronunciation to the trap-bath split of certain British English accents, notably the London and Received Pronunciation dialects, which creates a new "broad a" phoneme from words that elsewhere retain a "short a" sound. The environment of "broad a" overlaps with that of  tensing in that it occurs before voiceless fricatives in the same syllable and before nasals in certain environments, and both phenomena involve replacement of the short lax vowel  with a longer and tenser vowel.

New York City 
The distribution between /æ/ and /ɛə/ is largely predictable. In other open syllables, /æ/ tends to stay lax, regardless of the following consonant. (Contrasting that with the distinction between /ɒ/ and /ɔ/, Labov et al. reported that, in New York City, /sæd/ and /sɛəd/ were heard as the same word, but /sɒd/ and /sɔd/ were heard as two different words, suggesting minimal pairs of /æ/ and /ɛə/ to be not as likely in New York City as in Philadelphia.)

Exceptions include the following:
Function words with simple codas are usually lax
can (simple coda) with  vs. can't (complex coda) with 
Learned words (often including loanwords) are usually lax
alas and carafe with 
Abbreviated words or personal names are usually lax
Cass, Babs, and math with 
When a vowel-initial word-level suffix is added to a word with tense , the vowel remains tense even though it now stands in an open syllable
mannish has  like man, not  like manage
classy has  like class, not  like classic
passing has  like pass, not  like Pasadena
Words with initial /æ/ are usually lax, except for the most common words
aspirin and asterisk with  vs. ask and after (more common words) with 
Certain one-off exceptions (The word avenue usually has tense , unlike any other case of  before . The word family is quite variable.)

The New York City split system has also diffused, often with slightly different conditioning, into Albany, Cincinnati, New Orleans, and nearby parts of New Jersey.

Northern New Jersey
In Northern New Jersey, Labov finds the New York City system, but with some variability. East of the Hackensack River, by Hoboken, Elizabeth, and Jersey City, Labov finds the split with no more variation than in the city itself.

Between the Hackensack and Passaic Rivers, Labov finds speakers typically lack the function word constraint.  Thus, am, can (the verb), an, and and all typically result with tense . Labov also reports variable tensing in open syllables, resulting in potential tensing of planet and fashionable.

West of the Passaic River, /æ/-tensing only occurs before nasals.

Albany 
Like in Northern New Jersey, Labov finds that the New York split system has also diffused in Albany with some alterations. Although the function is lost in Northern New Jersey, Labov reports that the function constraint is weakened only in Albany.  Thus, can, an, and has may be tensed while have and had may be lax. Also, the open syllable constraint is variable in Northern New Jersey, but Labov reports that in Albany, that constraint is absent altogether. Thus, national, cashew, family, camera, planet, and manner are all tense.

Older Cincinnati 
Labov finds the remnants of the New York split system present in the now-declining traditional dialect of Cincinnati, with similar variations to Northern New Jersey and Albany. Like in Albany, the open-syllable constraint is completely absent. However, the function word and is reported as being lax.

Labov further reports consistently laxing before /g/. In New York, tensing before voiced fricatives is variable, but it is reported as consistent in Cincinnati.

New Orleans

Labov finds the New York split system in New Orleans with similar variations. As in older Cincinnati, tensing may also occur before voiced fricatives. As in Northern New Jersey, the function constraint is virtually absent. However, closer to the split of New York City proper, the open syllable constraint is still retained.

Philadelphia and Baltimore
Philadelphia and Baltimore use a different short-a system than New York City, but it is similar in that it is also a split system. Here are further examples that are true for Philadelphia and Baltimore, as well as for New York City:

Philadelphia/Baltimore exceptions include the New York exceptions listed above, as well as the following:
caf (truncation of cafeteria) has , not  like calf
path (truncation of pathology) has , not  like path 'way, road'
Mass (truncation of Massachusetts) has , not  like mass
Function words and irregular verb tenses have lax , even in an environment which would usually cause tensing:
and (a function word) has , not  like sand
ran (a strong verb tense) has , not  like man

Non-phonemic  raising systems

Before nasals 
However, they fail to split the "short a" into two contrasting phonemes, which the New York, Baltimore, Philadelphia, and Yat accents do. The nasal system is found in several separate and unrelated dialect regions, including the southern Midwest, northern New Jersey, Florida, and parts of Canada, but it is most prominent, the difference between the two allophones of  being the greatest and speakers with the nasal system being most concentrated, in eastern New England, including in Boston.

More widespread among speakers of the Western United States, Canada, and the southern Midwest is a "continuous system," which also revolves around "short a" before nasal consonants but has a less-extreme raising of the tongue than the "nasal system." Most varieties of General American English fall under that category.

The pattern most characteristic of Southern American English does not use  raising at all but uses what has been called the "Southern drawl" instead, with  becoming in essence a triphthong . However, many speakers from the South still use the nasal -raising system described above, particularly in Charleston, Atlanta, and Florida. Also, some speakers from the New Orleans area have been reported to have a system that is very similar to the phonemic split of New York.

Before  

General  raising 
In accents that have undergone the Northern cities vowel shift, mostly those of the Inland Northern United States, the phoneme  is raised and diphthongized in all possible environments: a "general raising" system. The Inland North dialect is spoken in such areas as Chicago, Cleveland, Detroit, Buffalo, Rochester, and Syracuse. However, a reversal of the raising (except before nasal consonants) has been observed in at least some communities in which it has been studied, including Lansing, Michigan, and Syracuse, New York.

Australian English 

For some speakers this raising is substantial, yet for others it is nonexistent.

For example, a word like 'Ben' would be pronounced , while 'ban' would be pronounced .

References

Sources
 
 
 
 

Splits and mergers in English phonology